Manila, also formerly known as Tondo until 1859, was a province in the Philippines, encompassing the former pre-Hispanic polities of Tondo, Maynila and Namayan. In 1898, it included the City of Manila (which mainly refers to the present-day Intramuros) and 23 other municipalities. Alongside the District of Morong, it was incorporated into the Province of Rizal in 1901.

Cities and municipalities
The province was last composed of the City of Manila and 23 other municipalities. The districts of Binondo, Dilao, Ermita, Malate, Pandacan, Quiapo, Sampaloc, San Miguel, Santa Ana, Santa Cruz, and Tondo are often referred to as "pueblos", "arrabales" ("suburbs") or "neighbourhoods" of Manila. The name Manila originally referred to the "city within the walls" (now Intramuros), but its meaning eventually came to include the suburbs surrounding it, leading to confusion about which places constitute "Manila" in the late 19th century.  From the 1860s onward, the area was often referred to as Ciudad de Manila y sus arrabales ("The City of Manila and its suburbs") or as Manila y los pueblos de extramuros ("Manila and the communities outside the walls"). The present-day City of Manila includes all these areas.

The municipalities of Antipolo, Boso-Boso, Cainta and Taytay were also part of the province, then known as Tondo, until 1853 when it was annexed to  Distrito Politico-Militar de los Montes de San Mateo (later known as Distrito Politico-Militar de Morong).

The table below presents information from the cited source.

Map
Shown below are the locations of the municipalities of the province of Manila, as of 1899. Except for Montalban and San Mateo that are in the present-day province of Rizal, all these areas are included in the present-day cities of Metro Manila.

See also
 Geography of Manila

References 

Former provinces of the Philippines
1571 establishments in the Philippines
1901 disestablishments in the Philippines
History of Metro Manila